The 2018 Curlers Corner Autumn Gold Curling Classic was held from October 5 to 8 at the Calgary Curling Club in Calgary, Alberta. The event was a triple knockout format, and the purse for the event was CAD$50,000, with the winning team receiving $13,000.

Kerri Einarson from Gimli defeated the reigning Canadian champion Jennifer Jones rink from Winnipeg in the final. The win gave Einarson and her team their 4th World Curling Tour win of the 2018-19 curling season.

Teams
The teams are listed as follows:

Knockout bracket

Source:

A event

B event

C event

Knockout results
All draw times listed in Mountain Time (UTC−07:00).

Draw 1
Friday, October 5, 9:30 am

Draw 2
Friday, October 5, 1:15 pm

Draw 3
Friday, October 5, 5:15 pm

Draw 4
Friday, October 5, 9:00 pm

Draw 5
Saturday, October 6, 9:00 am

Draw 6
Saturday, October 6, 12:45 pm

Draw 7
Saturday, October 6, 4:30 pm

Draw 8
Saturday, October 6, 8:15 pm

Draw 9
Sunday, October 7, 9:00 am

Draw 10
Sunday, October 7, 12:45 pm

Draw 11
Sunday, October 7, 4:30 pm

Draw 12
Sunday, October 7, 8:15 pm

Playoffs

Source:

Quarterfinals
Monday, October 8, 9:00 am

Semifinals
Monday, October 8, 12:15 pm

Final
Monday, October 8, 3:30 pm

References

External links
CurlingZone

Autumn Gold Curling Classic
2018 in Canadian curling
2018 in Alberta
October 2018 sports events in Canada
2018 in women's curling
2010s in Calgary